Fargher is a former community in Sherman County, Oregon, United States. It was founded by Arthur W. Fargher, a native of the Isle of Man, who arrived in Oregon in 1878. The community's rail station was located near the Sherars Bridge. It is contemporarily considered a ghost town.

References

1878 establishments in Oregon
Populated places established in 1878
Ghost towns in Oregon
Unincorporated communities in Sherman County, Oregon